Dave Taber (born September 26, 1958) is a retired American soccer defender who played two seasons in the North American Soccer League. He is currently the Vice President of Marketing and Sales for The Wealth Maintenance Organization.

Playing career
A high school All American soccer player, Taber attended Philadelphia Textile where he played on the men's soccer team. In 1980, he signed with the Tampa Bay Rowdies of the North American Soccer League. He saw time in only one game that season, but became a regular during the 1980–81 indoor season.

After soccer
After Taber retired from soccer, he entered the marketing department of Hercules Incorporated. After eight years with Hercules, he moved to Fresh Western Marketing which was located in Salinas, California before becoming a manager with Comcast Cellular. He then moved to Ericsson, Inc., where he was a vice president for six years. In September 2008, he became a vice president of marketing and sales with The Wealth Maintenance Organization.

References

External links
 NASL/MISL stats

1958 births
Living people
American soccer players
North American Soccer League (1968–1984) indoor players
North American Soccer League (1968–1984) players
Tampa Bay Rowdies (1975–1993) players
Philadelphia Rams soccer players
Association football defenders